Lagahida is one of the woredas in the Somali Region of Ethiopia. Part of the Fiq Zone, Lagahida is bordered on the south by Salahad, on the west by the Salahad, on the north by Oromia Region, and on the east by the wangay which separates it from Hamero.

Demographics 
Based on the 2007 Census conducted by the Central Statistical Agency of Ethiopia (CSA), this woreda has a total population of 187,415, of whom 108,633 are men and 78,782 women. While 31,861 or 17% are urban inhabitants, a further 155,554 or 35% are pastoralists. 100% of the population are Muslim.This woreda is primarily inhabited by the Ogaden/ ree cabdile particularly calinasir and shishore clan of the Somali people.  .

Notes 

Districts of Somali Region